Laura Lawless Robertson (born 1978) held the title of Miss Arizona 2002 and placed in the Top 15 Semifinals at the Miss America 2003 Pageant held on September 21, 2002, in Atlantic City, New Jersey.

Miss Arizona
Lawless competed at Miss Arizona as Miss Maricopa and had previously held the title of New York's Junior Miss 1996. She has also competed in the Miss Massachusetts and Miss New York pageants prior to moving to Arizona to attend law school.  Her talent was classical piano.  Her personal platform was Mental Health Matters: Encouraging Awareness, Advocacy, and Action, since she had been diagnosed with clinical depression at the age of 17.

Life after Miss Arizona
Lawless is currently a celebrity spokesperson for the National Alliance on Mental Illness and the National Alliance for Research on Schizophrenia and Depression (now known as the Brain & Behavior Research Foundation).  She also currently speaks about mental illness, traveling all around the country. She attended high school at Dominican Academy in Manhattan, NY. She is a graduate of Harvard University (2000) and Arizona State University College of Law (2005).  She is currently a partner attorney working at Squire Patton Boggs in Phoenix, focusing on labor and employment issues and on general litigation matters.

References

External links

 Official Miss America Profile

1978 births
Living people
Miss America 2003 delegates
Lawyers from New York City
Lawyers from Phoenix, Arizona
Harvard University alumni
Sandra Day O'Connor College of Law alumni